The 2017–18 Green Bay Phoenix men's basketball team represented the University of Wisconsin–Green Bay in the 2017–18 NCAA Division I men's basketball season. The Phoenix, led by third-year head coach Linc Darner, played their home games at the Resch Center, with one home game at the Kress Events Center, as members of the Horizon League. They finished the season 13–20, 7–11 in to finish in seventh place. They defeated Detroit in the first round of the Horizon League tournament before losing in the quarterfinals to eventual Horizon League Tournament champion Wright State.

Previous season
The Phoenix finished the 2016–17 season 18–14, 12–6 in Horizon League play to finish in a tie for third place. In the Horizon League tournament, they lost to UIC in the quarterfinals. They received an invitation to the College Basketball Invitational where they lost in the first round to UMKC.

Offseason

Departures

Recruiting class of 2017

Roster

Schedule and results

|-
!colspan=9 style=|  Exhibition

|-
!colspan=9 style=|  Non-Conference regular season

|-
!colspan=9 style=|  Horizon League regular season

|-
!colspan=9 style=|Horizon League tournament

References

Green Bay Phoenix
Green Bay Phoenix men's basketball seasons
Green Bay Phoenix men's b
Green Bay Phoenix men's b